The European Journal of Human Genetics is a monthly peer-reviewed scientific journal published by the Nature Publishing Group on behalf of the European Society of Human Genetics. It covers all aspects of human genetics.

Abstracting and indexing 
The journal is abstracted and indexed in:

According to the Journal Citation Reports, the journal had a 2021 impact factor of 5.351.

References

External links 
 

Academic journals associated with international learned and professional societies of Europe
Biology in Europe
English-language journals
Genetics in the United Kingdom
Medical genetics journals
Monthly journals
Nature Research academic journals
Publications established in 1993